Peter Whyte (born 25 February 1969) is a former Australian rules footballer who played with Geelong in the Victorian Football League (VFL).

Whyte, a utility from Barwon, was an All-Australian at Teal Cup level for Victoria. He was aged just 17 when he made six appearances for Geelong in the 1986 VFL season, the first in round 14. In 1987 he played 14 games, then was troubled by injury in 1988 and played just twice in the seniors.

After leaving Geelong, Whyte played for South Barwon and Werribee.

References

1969 births
Australian rules footballers from Victoria (Australia)
Geelong Football Club players
Werribee Football Club players
South Barwon Football Club players
Barwon Football Club players
Living people
People educated at Geelong College